The Children's Cancer Center of Lebanon (CCCL) is a non-profit medical institution dedicated to the  treatment of paediatric cancer. 
The center is affiliated with St. Jude Children's Research Hospital in Memphis, Tennessee. Children's Cancer Center of Lebanon was established under Notice no. 138AD with the affiliation of St. Jude Children's Research Hospital.

On 12 April 2002, the Prime Minister of Lebanon, Rafic Hariri, Princess Ghida Talal (Chairperson of Al-Amal Foundation in Amman, Jordan), and several members of the Lebanese cabinet and parliament attended the inauguration ceremony of the center.

The center is located in Building 56 at Rue Clémenceau and operates in association with the nearby American University of Beirut Medical Center (AUBMC)

References

Organisations based in Beirut
Medical research institutes
Children's hospitals
St. Jude Children's Research Hospital
Cancer organisations based in Lebanon
2002 establishments in Lebanon
Research institutes in Lebanon
Hospitals established in 2002
Child-related organisations in Lebanon